Ellen Smith  may refer to:

Ellen Smith (Fabian), British suffragette and social reformer 
Ellen Smith alias  for Muriel Scott, Scottish suffragette 
Poor Ellen Smith, 19th century popular murder ballad
Ellen M. Smith Three-Decker, house in Worcester, Massachusetts
Mary Ellen Smith (died 1933), Canadian politician

See also
Eleanor Smith (disambiguation)
Helen Smith (disambiguation)